The Middlesex RFU Vase is an annual rugby union knock-out club competition organised by the Middlesex Rugby Football Union and donated by Russell Grant Founder of the Federation of Middlesex Sports.  It was first introduced during the 2002–03 season, with the inaugural winners being London French.  It is the third most important cup competition organised by the Middlesex RFU, behind the Senior Cup and Senior Bowl. 

The Senior Vase is currently open to all club sides based in the historic county of Middlesex not eligible for the Senior Cup or Senior Vase, typically playing between tiers 9 (Herts/Middlesex 1) and tiers 10 (Herts/Middlesex 2) of the English rugby union league system.  The format is a knockout cup with a first round, semi-finals and a final to be held at one of the finalist's home ground between March–June (although final dates can vary drastically).

Middlesex Senior Vase winners

Number of wins
Harrow (2)
Old Streetonians (2)
HAC (1)
Hackney (1)
Hendon (1)
Finsbury Park (1)
London French (1)
London Welsh (1)
Old Abbotstonians (1)
Old Grammarians (1)
Old Haberdashers (1)
Old Isleworthians (1)
St Nicholas Old Boys (1)

Notes

See also
 Middlesex RFU
 Middlesex Senior Cup
 Middlesex Senior Bowl
 English rugby union system
 Rugby union in England

References

External links
 Middlesex RFU

Recurring sporting events established in 2002
2002 establishments in England
Rugby union cup competitions in England
Sport in London
Rugby union in Middlesex